Marcin Jakubowski founded Open Source Ecology (OSE) in 2003. Jakubowski is an advocate of open source hardware as a foundation for the open source economy  particularly distributed manufacturing, open source agriculture, and open source product development.

OSE made it to the world stage in 2011 when Jakubowski gave a TED Talk. on the Global Village Construction Set. Shortly after, the GVCS won Make magazine's  "Green Project Contest". The Internet blogs Gizmodo and Grist produced detailed features on OSE. Jakubowski has since become a Shuttleworth Foundation Fellow (2012) and TED Senior Fellow (2012).

Personal life
Marcin Jakubowski is born in Poznan, People’s Republic of Poland. Jacubowski and Catarina Mota were married on 27 December 2013 at Grand Central Station in New York City. They are collaborating on open hardware projects, with a collaboration on the Open Building Institute started in 2016.

Professional life
After receiving a Ph.D. in physics from the University of Wisconsin, Madison, Jacubowski founded the Open Source Ecology project. He has been working on this from 2004 until present, at the company headquarters  Factor e Farm, in the Kansas City area. Most prototyping and development occur at this facility. This includes the work on housing with the Open Building Institute, whose goal is to make affordable, ecological housing widely accessible.

References

Open source people
Living people
University of Wisconsin–Madison College of Letters and Science alumni
1972 births